"Chop-Chop" is a song by English rock band Killing Joke and the second single from their studio album Revelations. It was released by E.G. Records as a 7" single, backed by B-side "Good Samaritan". This single, unlike "Empire Song", did not chart.

Production and release 
"Chop-Chop" suffered the same fate as "Empire Song". At the band's performance on Top of the Pops, the "Fake Coleman" keyboardist was used again with drummer Paul Ferguson as singer. At this time, frontman Jaz Coleman was the only member of Killing Joke to have moved to Iceland. However, by the end of the year, the other three members also moved to Iceland to avoid the Apocalypse, as predicted by Coleman.

Track listing 
Side A
"Chop-Chop" – 04:18

Side B
"Good Samaritan" – 03:30

References

External links 

1982 songs
Killing Joke songs
E.G. Records singles
Songs written by Jaz Coleman
Songs written by Geordie Walker
Songs written by Youth (musician)
Songs written by Paul Ferguson